Darreh Rast (also Romanized as Darreh Rāst) is a village in Kamazan-e Sofla Rural District, Zand District, Malayer County, Hamadan Province, Iran. At the 2006 census, its population was 29, in 10 families.

References 

Populated places in Malayer County